Acompsia dimorpha is a moth of the family Gelechiidae. It is found in the French and Spanish Pyrenees. The habitat consists of the alpine zone.

The wingspan is 16–20 mm for males and 11–13 mm for females. The forewings of the males are greyish to black brown, mottled with light yellow or light greyish scales. The hindwings are light grey. They have black-brown forewings, mottled with yellow and light brown scales. The hindwings light grey, but darker at the apex. Adults are on wing from late July to early August.

References

Moths described in 1904
Acompsia
Moths of Europe